Gleneonupserha vaga is a species of beetle in the family Cerambycidae. It was described by Charles Joseph Gahan in 1909.

References

Saperdini
Beetles described in 1909